Hanstein may refer to:

People
Alexander von Hanstein, Count of Pölzig and Beiersdorf (1804–1884), Thuringian count
Fritz Huschke von Hanstein (1911–1996), German race driver and Porsche's public relations manager
Georg Fredrik Wilhelm Hanstein (1820–1862), Norwegian architect
Johannes von Hanstein (1822–1880), German botanist who was a native of Potsdam
John Hanstein or Adolf Zytogorski (–1882), Polish-British chess player and translator
Ludwig Hanstein (1892–1918), German World War I flying ace
Wilhelm Hanstein (1811–1850), German chess player and writer

Places
Hanstein Castle, ruined castle in the middle of Germany in the Eichsfeld, above the river Werra, in Thuringia
Hanstein-Rusteberg, collective municipality in the district Eichsfeld, in Thuringia, Germany